This list ranks buildings in Bologna buildings that stand at least  tall. This includes spires and architectural details but does not include antenna masts.  An equal sign (=) following a rank indicates the same height between two or more buildings. The "Year" column indicates the year in which a building was completed.

History

Medieval towers
Bologna, the main city of Emilia-Romagna, in Italy, was called the City of Towers or City of the Two Towers during the Middle Ages, because of the huge number of medieval towers. Some of these medieval towers can still be seen in the city. This list does not include the Asinelli Tower, built in 1119 with a height of 97.2 meters.

Modern towers
In the last decades, the city started to build more modern tall buildings, such as the 1958 "La Meridiana" building, a condominium located in Via Cellini, . Several modern towers, designed by the architect Kenzo Tange, were built in the Fiera District during the seventies. 
In 2012 Unipol Tower was completed. It was the first Bologna skyscraper that exceeds 100 meters of height. It is the highest building in the city and currently 7th in Italy.

List

See also 

List of tallest buildings in Italy

References